My Wife's Romance is a 2011 French drama film written and directed by Djamshed Usmonov and starring Olivier Gourmet and Léa Seydoux.

Plot 
Eve's husband Paul, disappears mysteriously one day and leaves behind a huge debt. As the police investigates the case, Paul's former associate Chollet offers Eve his support. Little later Chollet becomes himself a suspect.

Cast 
 Olivier Gourmet as Chollet 
 Léa Seydoux as Eve 
 Gilles Cohen as the police officer
 Maruf Pulodzoda as Amro
 Kseniya Rappoport as Amro's wife
 Thibault Vinçon as Alexandre 
 Sacha Bourdo as the translator

References

External links 
 

2011 drama films
2011 films
2010s French-language films
French drama films
Films directed by Jamshed Usmonov
2010s French films